General elections were held in Saint Lucia in 1931.

Background
In 1924 a partially elected Legislative Council of 12 members was established with nine nominated seats and three elected seats. Prior to the 1931 elections, women were given the right to vote and run for office.

Campaign
Louis McVane was the only candidate in Northern District. Western District was contested by H.E. Belmar and DuBoulay, who had a heated campaign.

Results
All three MLCs elected in 1928 were re-elected; George Palmer in Eastern District, McVane in Northern District and Belmar in Western District.

References

Saint Lucia
Elections in Saint Lucia